Liv Lisa Fries (born 31 October 1990) is a German actress who has appeared in several films and who gained an international following as the female lead Charlotte Ritter in the German TV series Babylon Berlin, which first premiered in 2017.

Early life and education 
Liv Lisa Fries was born on 31 October 1990 at the Charité Hospital, Berlin, Germany. She was raised in the Berlin borough of Pankow.

As an exchange student, Fries studied in Beijing. In addition to native German, she speaks English, French and Mandarin.

After receiving her Abitur in 2010, Fries enrolled again at university to study philosophy and literary science, but had to drop out as her career as an actress progressed.

Career
Fries wanted to become an actress when she was 14 years old after watching Léon: The Professional because she was impressed by Natalie Portman's performance. After making her debut in 2002, Fries has gone on to appear in almost 40 acting roles, the majority of which have come in German films and TV series such as Zurich, Add a Friend and The Wave. Her first film role was in Atomised (2005) (German: Elementarteilchen); however, her role was cut from the film. She then appeared in 2006 with an episode of Schimanski, in which she played the female lead role.

She performed in the German made-for-television film  (2010) as an aggressive, frustrated teenager named Linda who tortures one of her peers. Fries said that during filming, she started feeling lonely and isolated, just like her character.

In 2013, she starred in the German tragicomedy Zurich (original title Und morgen Mittag bin ich tot). She received wide critical acclaim for her performance as Lea, a young woman with cystic fibrosis. According to Fries, she prepared for the role by meeting with a patient with the disease, in addition to running up stairs while breathing through a straw. For her role, she was awarded the Bavarian Film Prize 2013, the Max Ophüls Prize, a German Film Critics Award, and the German Director's Prize.

Fries received her most prominent role to date when she was cast in 2016 as Charlotte Ritter in the German prestige television show Babylon Berlin. In Babylon Berlin, Fries stars as a police stenographer from a poor background who uses her resourcefulness and connections to investigate a series of crimes in Weimar Republic-era Berlin. The first two series of the show were filmed over eight months beginning in May 2016 and released consecutively in the Autumn of 2017. Babylon Berlin has been very popular in Germany as well as with international audiences, and has elevated Fries to international prominence; Fries is considered one of Germany's upcoming stars and has been featured in many magazines. For her portrayal, Fries shared an Adolf Grimme Award with the Babylon Berlin team.

The show went on a year-long production hiatus during which Fries filmed two projects; she played a recurring role in both seasons of the 2017 American TV series Counterpart, and also co-starred in the film Prélude with Louis Hofmann. In late 2018, Fries began the six-month shoot for the third season of Babylon Berlin which premiered in Germany in January 2020 and arrived on Sky Atlantic on 5 March. All three series of Babylon Berlin are now sold on DVD. In June 2020 a Series Four production was underway and premiered in 2022.

Personal life 
A private person, as of 2020 Fries lives in a village in Brandenburg where her favorite hobby is horse-riding.

Selected filmography

Film
 Die Welle (2008)
  (2010)
 Romeos (2011)
 Zurich (2013)
 Staudamm (2013)
 Die Präsenz (2014)
 Boy 7 (2015)
  (2015)
  (2016). This German-language movie is about Lou Andreas-Salomé.
 Rakete Perelman (2017)
 Prélude (2019)
 Hinterland (2021)
 Confessions of Felix Krull (2021)
 Munich – The Edge of War (2021)
 Zwischen uns (2021)

Television
  (2010) (TV film)
 Polizeiruf 110 (2012) (TV episode)
 Tatort (2014) (TV episode)
 NSU German History X (2016) (TV mini-series)
 Babylon Berlin (2017) (TV series)
 Counterpart (2017-19) (TV series)

Awards
 2012: Best Young Actress for Sie hat es verdient (Goldene Kamera Awards)
 2014: Best Young Actress for Zurich (Bavarian Film Awards)
 2014: Best Young Actress for Zurich (Max-Ophüls-Preis)
 2014: Best Actress for Zurich (Deutscher Regiepreis Metropolis)
 2015: Best Actress for Zurich (Preis der deutschen Filmkritik)
 2018: Grimme-Preis for Babylon Berlin (note: everyone with a major role  involved with the production of the series won the award, including all three lead actors)

References

External links
 

21st-century German actresses
Actresses from Berlin
1990 births
German television actresses
German film actresses
Living people
German expatriates in China
People from Pankow